Igor Genua (born 5 June 1988) is a Spanish rugby union player. He was named in Spain's national rugby sevens team for the 2016 Summer Olympics; and was also in the squad that played at the 2016 Men's Rugby Sevens Final Olympic Qualification Tournament in Monaco.

References

External links 
 
 

1988 births
Living people
Rugby sevens players at the 2016 Summer Olympics
Olympic rugby sevens players of Spain
Spain international rugby sevens players
Spanish rugby union players
Rugby union players from the Basque Country (autonomous community)
Spain international rugby union players
People from Hernani
Sportspeople from Gipuzkoa